Talking Angela is a chatterbot app developed by Slovenian studio Outfit7 as part of the Talking Tom & Friends series. It was released on November 13, 2012 and January 2012 for iPhone, iPod and iPad, January 2013 for Android, and January 2014 for Google Play. The app's successor, the My Talking Angela app, was released in December 2014.

Paedophile hoax
In February 2014, Talking Angela was the subject of an Internet hoax claiming that it encourages children to disclose personal information about themselves, which is ostensibly then used by paedophiles to identify the location of these children. The rumor, which was widely circulated on Facebook and various websites claiming to be dedicated to parenting, claims that Angela, the game's main character, asks the game's user for private personal information using the game's text-chat feature. Other versions of the rumor even attribute the disappearance of a child to the app, or claim that it is run by a  paedophile ring, while some go so far as to even claim that the user is recorded by the camera and can be seen in Angela's eyes.

It was debunked by Snopes.com soon afterwards. The site's owners, Barbara and David Mikkelson, reported that they had tried to "prompt" it to give responses asking for private information but were unsuccessful, even when asking it explicitly sexual questions. While it is true that, in the game with child mode off, Angela does ask for the user's name, age and personal preferences to determine conversation topics, Outfit7 has said that this information is all "anonymized" and all personal information is removed from it. It is also impossible for a person to take control of what Angela says in the game, since the app is based on chat bot software.

In 2015, the hoax was revived again on Facebook, prompting online security company Sophos and The Guardian to debunk it again. Sophos employee Paul Ducklin wrote on the company's blog that the message being posted on Facebook promoting the hoax was "close to 600 rambling, repetitious words, despite claiming at the start that it didn’t have words to describe the situation. It's ill-written, and borders on being illiterate and incomprehensible." Bruce Wilcox, one of the game's programmers, has attributed the hoax's popularity to the fact that the chatbot program in Talking Angela is so realistic.

However, genuine concern has been raised that the game's child mode may be too easy for children to turn off, which, if they did, would allow them to purchase "coins", which can be used as currency in the game, via iTunes. Disabling child mode also enables the chat feature, which, while it is not "connecting your children to  paedophiles," still raises concerns as well, according to Stuart Dredge, a journalist from The Guardian. Dredge wrote that in chat mode, Angela asks for information such as the user's name.

Impact
The scare has significantly boosted the game's popularity, and is credited with helping the app make it into the top 10 free iPhone apps soon after the hoax became widely known in February 2015 and 3rd most popular for all iPhone apps at the start of the following month. By 2017, the chat feature was removed from the app.

See also
 Talking Tom & Friends
 My Talking Tom

References

2011 video games
IOS games
Outfit7 games
Android (operating system) games
Chat games
Video games about animals
Chatbots
Talking Tom & Friends
Video games developed in Slovenia
2014 hoaxes
2015 hoaxes
Video game controversies